Hesperotingis is a genus of lace bugs in the family Tingidae. There are about eight described species in Hesperotingis.

Species
These eight species belong to the genus Hesperotingis:
 Hesperotingis antennata Parshley, 1917
 Hesperotingis duryi (Osborn and Drake, 1916)
 Hesperotingis floridana Drake, 1928
 Hesperotingis fuscata Parshley, 1917
 Hesperotingis illinoiensis Drake, 1918
 Hesperotingis mississipiensis Drake, 1928
 Hesperotingis mississippiensis Drake, 1928
 Hesperotingis occidentalis Drake, 1922

References

Further reading

 
 
 
 
 
 
 
 
 
 
 

Tingidae
Cimicomorpha genera